Vadnais Lake is a lake in Ramsey County, in the U.S. state of Minnesota.

Vadnais Lake was named after John Vadnais, a pioneer settler.

See also
List of lakes in Minnesota

References

Lakes of Minnesota
Lakes of Ramsey County, Minnesota